Parliamentary elections were held in Yugoslavia in June 1963. They were the first held under the 1963 constitution which created a five-chamber Federal Assembly. Only one chamber, the 120-seat Federal Council, was chosen by universal suffrage, with its election taking place on 16 June. The other four chambers, the Economic Council, the Educational-Cultural Council, the Social and Heath Council and the Organisational-Political Council were elected between 3 and 16 June by people employed or specialising in those industries.

References

Yugoslavia
Elections in Yugoslavia
Parliamentary election
Yugoslavian parliamentary election
One-party elections
Election and referendum articles with incomplete results